Jilundi is a small village located near Bhanjanagar of Ganjam district in Orissa. It is located 88 km towards North from District Headquarters Chhatrapur. 161 km from State capital Bhubaneswar. Bhanjanagar, Dihapadhal, Lalsingi, Inginathi, Sanakodanda are the nearby Villages to Jilundi. Oriya is the Local Language here.

References 

Villages in Ganjam district